Casteldebole is a railway station serving the suburb of Casteldebole, part of the city of Bologna, in the region of Emilia-Romagna, northern Italy. The station opened in 2002 and is located on the Porrettana railway. The train services are operated by Trenitalia Tper.

The station is currently managed by Rete Ferroviaria Italiana (RFI), a subsidiary of Ferrovie dello Stato Italiane (FSI), Italy's state-owned rail company.

Location
Casteldebole railway station is situated west of the city centre.

History
The station was opened on December 29, 2002.

Features
The station does not feature any building.

It consists of two tracks linked by an underpass.

In spring 2011, the underpass was renovated: professional writers, as well as students from the local middle school Alessandro Volta, enriched it with artistic paintings.

Train services

The station is served by the following service(s):

 Suburban services (Treno suburbano) on line S1A, Bologna - Porretta Terme
 Suburban services (Treno suburbano) on line S2A, Bologna - Vignola

See also

 List of railway stations in Bologna
 List of railway stations in Emilia-Romagna
 Bologna metropolitan railway service

References 

Railway stations in Bologna
Railway stations opened in 2002